The Williams FW45 is a Formula One racing car designed and constructed by Williams competing in the 2023 Formula One World Championship. The car is driven by Logan Sargeant and Alexander Albon, who are in their first and second years with the team respectively.

Design and development
The FW45 was first revealed on 6 February 2023.

Complete Formula One results
(key)

* Season still in progress.

References 

Williams Formula One cars